is a governing body for radio controlled car racing in Japan. As it represents domestic racing in Japan, the JMRCA is affiliated with IFMAR

History
It was founded in February 1971 with the backing of Kyosho, the industry leader at the time, to feed on an increasing demand for R/C car racing popularised by U.S. military personnels stationed in Japan in preparation for the Vietnam War. Its first race was the First Japan-America Goodwill RC Car Race at the following month, hosted jointly by the JMRCA and the U.S. Air Force Model Club held at their Tokyo Tachikawa Base.

One of its first races hosted by JMRCA was a championship race for 1/8 scale racing cars produced by Kyosho. Taking place at a specially constructed race course at Fuji Speedway, the winning driver was rewarded with a trip to Hawaii.

The first championship took place in 1978 for 1:8 scale pan cars and the first electric car championship was a year later.

Non-Japanese winners
Each year, JMRCA have invited drivers from other countries to compete but as invited drivers, only Japanese drivers are eligible to claim the championship titles, thus the title is awarded to the next best Japanese finisher. Ronald Völker is the only driver to have achieved this more than once.

References

External links
Official site

Radio-controlled car racing organizations
Radio car